Cowell  is an English language surname.

People
Notable people with this surname include:
 Brady Cowell (1899–1989), American college sports coach
 Brendan Cowell (born 1976), Australian actor, screenwriter and director
 Butch Cowell (1887–1940), American coach and administrator in college athletics, brother of Roland
 Cressida Cowell (born 1966), English children's author, known for novel How to Train Your Dragon
 Damian Cowell (born ), Australian musician
 Edward Byles Cowell (1826–1903), professor of Sanskrit at Cambridge University
 Elizabeth Cowell (1912–1998), British broadcaster and television announcer
 Frank Cowell, professor at the London School of Economics and Political Science
 Henry Cowell (1897–1965), American composer
 Several people named John Cowell:
 John "Jack" Cowell (1887–date unknown), English footballer
 John Cowell (1889–1918), Irish World War I flying ace
 John Cowell (1554–1611), English jurist
 Sir John Clayton Cowell (1832–1894), British Army general and Master of the Queen's Household
 John F. Cowell (1852–1915), American botanist
 John G. Cowell (1785–1814), American Navy officer during the War of 1812
 Joseph Cowell (1792–1863), British actor and painter
 Lowell Cowell (born 1945), former NASCAR Cup Series driver
 Nicholas Cowell (born 1961), British estate agent and businessman
 Philip Herbert Cowell (1870–1949), British astronomer
 Roberta Cowell (1918–2011), British racing driver and fighter pilot; first known British transsexual woman to undergo sex reassignment surgery
 Roland Cowell (1895–1953), American coach and administrator in college athletics, brother of Butch
 Sam Cowell (1820–1864), British actor and singer of comical songs
 Sammy Cowell (born 1991), Thai actress and model
 Samuel Cowell (1801–1875), English businessman and printer based in Ipswich
 Two people named Simon Cowell:
 Simon Cowell (born 1959), British record producer and impresario, known for Britain's Got Talent and other shows
 Simon Cowell (born 1952), British conservationist and television presenter, host of Wildlife SOS 
 Stanley Cowell (1941–2020), American jazz pianist and founder of the Strata-East Records label
 Theodore Robert Cowell, birth name of Ted Bundy (1946–1989), American serial killer, kidnapper, rapist and necrophile
 Tony Cowell (born 1950), British radio broadcaster and author

See also
Cowell (disambiguation), other things named Cowell

English-language surnames